Miconia prasina is a species of tree in the family Melastomataceae. It is native to Mexico, Central America, the Caribbean and South America.

References

prasina
Trees of Mexico
Trees of South America